The 1980 World Junior Ice Hockey Championships (1980 WJHC) was the fourth edition of the Ice Hockey World Junior Championship and was held from December 27, 1979, until January 2, 1980. The tournament was held in Helsinki, Finland. The Soviet Union won its fourth consecutive gold medal, while Finland won the silver, and Sweden the bronze.

Pool A
The 1980 tournament divided participants into two divisions of four teams, each playing three games. The top two teams in each division advanced to the championship round, while the bottom two were placed in the consolation round. Each division played another round robin. The top three teams in the championship won the gold, silver and bronze medals. Teams that faced each other in the first round had their results carried over to the final rounds.

Final standings
This is the aggregate standings, ordered according to final placing. The four teams in the championship round were ranked one through four, while the four teams in the consolation round were ranked five through eight regardless of overall record.

 was relegated to Pool B for the 1981 World Junior Ice Hockey Championships.

Preliminary round

Gold group

Blue group

Consolation round
Results from any games played during the preliminary round were carried forward to the consolation round.

Championship round
Results from any games played during the preliminary round were carried forward to the championship round.

Scoring leaders

Tournament awards

Pool B
The second tier of the World Junior Championship was contested in Klagenfurt, Austria from March 7 to 13, 1980.  Eight teams were divided into two groups of four that played a round robin, followed by placement games against the respective team in the other group.  The Hungarian team made their first appearance this year.

Preliminary round

Group A

Group B

Final round

7th place game

5th place game

3rd place game

1st place game

 was promoted to Pool A for the 1981 World Junior Ice Hockey Championships.

Scoring leaders

References 

 
 1977–81 World Junior Hockey Championships at TSN
 Results at passionhockey.com

World Junior Ice Hockey Championships
World Junior Ice Hockey Championships
International ice hockey competitions hosted by Finland
World Junior Ice Hockey Championships
World Junior Ice Hockey Championships
Sport in Vantaa
International sports competitions in Helsinki
World Junior Ice Hockey Championships, 1980
World Junior Ice Hockey Championships, 1980
World Junior Ice Hockey Championships
International ice hockey competitions hosted by Austria
Sports competitions in Klagenfurt
World Junior Ice Hockey Championships